The 2020 Oregon Attorney General election was held on November 3, 2020, to elect the Attorney General of Oregon. Incumbent Democratic Attorney General Ellen Rosenblum was originally appointed to the role by former Governor John Kitzhaber on June 29, 2012 to finish the term of her predecessor John Kroger, who resigned from office. She was elected to a full term in 2012 and re-elected in 2016. This office is not subject to term limits, and Rosenblum won a third full term, defeating Republican activist Michael Cross who led an unsuccessful 2019 attempt to recall Governor Kate Brown.

Democratic primary

Candidates

Declared 

 Ellen Rosenblum, incumbent Attorney General

Results

Republican primary

Candidates

Declared 
 Michael Cross, software designer and leader of an unsuccessful attempt to recall Governor Kate Brown in 2019

Withdrawn 
 Daniel Zene Crowe, lawyer and Republican nominee for Attorney General in 2016 (withdrew candidacy effective March 13, 2020)

Results

General election

Predictions

Results

References 

Attorney General
Oregon